Thompsonia is a genus of barnacles which has evolved into an endoparasite of other crustaceans, including crabs and snapping shrimp. It spreads through the host's body as a network of threads, and produces many egg capsules which emerge through joints in the host's shell.

Taxonomic history
The first scientific description of the genus was Robby Kossmann's description in 1872 of Thompsonia globosa. Kossmann named the genus after John Vaughan Thompson, the Irish naturalist who had recognised the cirripedian affinities of the Rhizocephala. The type specimens had been collected by Georg Semper in the East Indies, on the legs of the crab Lybia tessellata. Eleven species are now recognised:
Thompsonia affinis Krüger, 1912
Thompsonia chuni Häfele, 1911
Thompsonia cubensis Reinhard & Stewart, 1956
Thompsonia edwardsi Coutière, 1902
Thompsonia globosa Kossmann, 1872
Thompsonia haddoni Coutière, 1902
Thompsonia japonica Häfele, 1911
Thompsonia littoralis Lützen & Jespersen, 1990
Thompsonia pilodiae Lützen & Jespersen, 1990
Thompsonia reinhardi Lützen, 1992
Thompsonia sinensis Keppen, 1877

References

Further reading

Barnacles
Crustacean genera
Parasites of crustaceans
Parasitic crustaceans
Endoparasites